David Lister is a South African-born film and television director, now residing in Australia.

David Lister grew up on a farm in Mpumalanga Province, South Africa. He trained as a painter and sculptor in Pretoria before being employed as a scene painter, set designer and head of the props department at the Performing Arts Council in Transvaal. After a brief period as a documentary cameraman at SABC TV, he departed to the UK and studied at the London Film School 1972–1974. He then returned to South Africa to work as a director in the film and television industry.

Around 2005 he moved to Australia.

Selected filmography
 1984 - River Horse Lake
 1983 - My Friend Angelo (TV period drama)
 1987 - John Ross: An African Adventure
 1988 - Barney Barnato (TV series about the South African mine mogul Barney Barnato)
 1990 - The Rutanga Tapes (also known as Desert Chase)
 1993 - Oh Shucks! Here Comes UNTAG (also known as Kwagga Strikes Back)
 1991 - Konings (TV drama)
 1994 - Where Angels Tread (TV drama)
 1995 - Soweto Green
 1996-1998 - The Legend of the Hidden City (TV series)
 1997 - Panic Mechanic
 1998 - The Last Leprechaun
 1999 - Dazzle
 2001 - The Meeksville Ghost
 2001 - Askari
 2001 – The Sorcerer's Apprentice
 2002 - Pets
 2003 - Beauty and the Beast
 2004 - The Story of an African Farm (also known as Bustin’ Bonaparte)
 2005-2006 - Known Gods (TV series)
 2009 - Malibu Shark Attack (TV film)
Beauty and the Beast (2009 film)

External links
 David Listers official website Retrieved 2022-10-11
 Presentation of David Lister on Vimeo Retrieved 2011-08-06

References

South African film directors
South African television directors
Living people
Year of birth missing (living people)
Place of birth missing (living people)